A compressed audio optical disc, MP3 CD, or MP3 CD-ROM or MP3 DVD is an optical disc (usually a CD-R, CD-RW, DVD-R or DVD-RW) that contains digital audio in the MP3 file format. Discs are written in the "Yellow Book" standard data format (used for CD-ROMs and DVD-ROMs), as opposed to the Red Book standard audio format (used for CD-DA audio CDs).

Description
Compressed to audio files are supported by many modern CD players as well as DVD players. Disc players are capable of playing compressed formats, such as MP3, the most commonly used format, as well as Ogg Vorbis, the proprietary Windows Media Audio and ATRAC.

Because of audio data compression, optical discs do not have to spin all of the time, potentially saving battery power; however, decompressing the audio takes more processor time. The audio is buffered in random-access memory, which also provides protection against skipping.

The number of files that a disc can hold depends on how the audio files are encoded and the length of the audio. A standard audio CD (74 minutes) can hold about 18 audio programs, a 650-MB data CD (equivalent to 74-minute audio CD) containing mid-quality (160-kb/s) audio files can hold approximately 9.5 hours of audio or about 138 audio tracks.

ID3 tags stored in compressed audio files can be displayed by some players, and some players can search for audio files within directories on a compressed audio optical disc.

There is no official standard for how audio files on a compressed audio optical CD are stored on discs. As such, the format expected by different players varies. This sometimes leads to incompatibilities and difficulty in playing discs, often because of filename length limits, sub-directory limits, number of files limits, and special character bugs.  Sometimes, pressed CDs containing MP3s can be used, since some CD-ROM video games can act as an "MP3 CD" for some users.  Some older classic CD-ROM games tend to use WAV files since WAV files were the biggest audio format throughout the 90s, in which WAV files on optical discs are also compatible with CD players which have Yellow Book CD-ROM support.

Use in audiobooks

This technology is most commonly used in audiobooks new on CD since 2000 or so. Especially since unabridged audiobooks can run into many hours length. CEA/APA has published the following standards on audiobooks.
CEA-2003-C - Digital Audiobook File Format and Player Requirements
CEA-2004, Audiobook Media and Player Compatibility.

Advantages compared to Red Book audio CDs
longer runtime as per file compression
6 red book audio discs for the price of one Yellow Book (CD-ROM), depending on file compression rates
Longer battery life from fewer disc spins
Discs marketed without "music" endorsement aren't rejected since Yellow Book mode (CD-ROM) is being used instead of Red Book audio mode.

Disadvantages compared to other means to play compressed digital audio
Most disadvantages with compressed audio optical discs are present with CDs, and DVDs in general.

Re-write (RW) limits and compatibility compared to write-once (R)
Compared to solid-state flash memory which can be rewritten a finite amount of about 100,000 times and hard drives which can be rewritten a near-infinite number of times, optical discs with compressed audio on them are either non-rewritable (CD-R/DVD-R), or can only be rewritten about 1000 times, which includes having to erase the entire volume before re-writing (CD-RW/DVD-RW).  In some cases 1000 write/erase cycles (including entire volume erasure per re-write) on RW optical discs vs. 100,000+ write/erase cycles on flash memory (while retaining old data) can be somewhat of a moot point with applications that have less demand for usage.

Another issue re-writable optical discs suffer from, is that the re-writable discs have less compatibility with older disc players, though most CD and DVD players that support MP3s and other compressed audio will support RW discs easily.

Longevity of service life
The dependency of moving parts for the associated equipment guarantees less runtime than solid-state portable media players for battery life reasons, as well as the overall service life.  When being looped, an optical disc player can fail in less than one month when spinning uninterrupted, and solid-state portable media players can run for as long as 6 months uninterrupted without failure.

Shelf space
Yellow Book optical disc ROMs with compressed audio may free up as many as five Red Book audio CDs, but they still demand much shelf space, compared to external hard drives and solid-state flash memory.

Material degradation
Unlike mechanical disks with permanent housing such as hard drives, and solid-state devices like flash memory which generally has inexpensive but tough housing, optical discs typically have a reflective surface that can get damaged at relatively low thresholds of surface damage, in which if damage is just accidental, it could mean rendering it unusable.  Also, the repeated handling of discs between jewel case and disc drive exposes the disc to dust, and also makes the disc liable to be damaged permanently.

Also note that some CD and DVD discs also have defective aluminum layers that can flake, and damage the disc naturally.

If an archival-grade disc is used, such as gold CD or M-DISC, the disc can last far longer than hard drives or flash memory.

File/volume size limits and access to files
Repeated insertion and removal of optical discs can occur when somebody has to deal with multi-gigabyte collections which can span across as many as 10 CD-Rs (or 5 DVD-Rs) or even more when lots more gigabytes were to be used.  Sometimes when somebody is looking for a specific MP3 or similar; it can result in insertion and removal if more discs were used to increase the size of a library of files, in which copying the files to a hard drive, and archiving them there can be a workaround to ensure faster access to files.

Recordable Blu-ray Discs can somewhat solve this problem, but they too suffer from most other disadvantages.  The high cost of stand-alone Blu-ray burners, as well as the higher cost of equipment with BD-ROM drives can negate buying sold-state flash memory instead, of which the re-writability of flash memory also negates Blu-ray's apparent advantages.

See also
 Red Book: Compact Disc Digital Audio (CD-DA)
 Yellow Book: Compact Disc Read-Only Memory (CD-ROM)

References

MP3
Compact disc
DVD